Doru Shahabad (also written as Dooru Shahabad or only Doru) is a town and the headquarters of the Dooru tehsil in the Anantnag district of the Indian union territory of Jammu and Kashmir. It also known as a historical township in South Kashmir's Anantnag district.  Doru Shahabad is considered place of intelligence, where great scholars like Mehmood shah Gami, Rasul Mir Shahabadi were born. These scholars contributed to the literature and culture of Kashmir. In present times, Shahabad has produced chief ministers such as Syed Mir Qasim, other politicians, bureaucrats, and leading agricultural scientists.

Demographics
According to the 2011 Indian census, Doru had a population of 19,429. Males constituted 53% of the population and females 47%. Doru had an average literacy rate of 70.61%, higher than the national average of 68%, with 83.09% of the males and 58.41% of females literate. 23% of the population was under 6 years of age.

Notable people

Poetry 
Famous Kashmiri poets, such as Rasool Mir (also known as the John Keats of Kashmir), Mahmud Gami (Jaami of Kashmir), Hamidullah Shahabadi, Asad Mir, Peer Mushkoor, Ghulam Ahmad Wani (Ama Thoker) lived in Doru Shahabad. The religious Kashmiri pandit scholar Sh. Damodhar Pandita Shahabadi and colonial Indian and Pakistani writer Saadat Hasan Manto also had there roots in Doru Shahabad. Doru is also inhabited by heirs of Kashmiri poetry including: S.M. Maqbool Fayiz, Peer Ghulam Mohammad Astana Shahid,Yasir Kashmiri, A.G. Nisar Shahbadi, Waahid Kashmiri, Sher Ali Bodha, Figaar Kashmiri, and Armaan Shahabadi.

Literature 
The famous historian of Zain-ul-Aabideen's court, Mullah Mohammad, who translated Rajatarangini from Sanskrit into Persian, was from Doru Shahabad, along with Mir Saidullah, the author of Bagh-i-Sulaiman.

Politics/Activism 
Doru was home to Ghulam Ahmad Itoo, a peasant reformer for Kashmiri peasants under the Dogra rule. 

Itoo was a pioneer of the Land Reform Movement which worked for the rights of Kashmiri peasants. He was jailed by the authorities. Syed Mir Qasim, who served as Jammu and Kashmir Chief Minister from 1971 to 1975, as well as social activist Abdul Gani Malik.

Syed Hussain currently resides in Doru. He has been M.L.A, M.L.C, chairman of the legislative council and executive member of several other as a member of the Rajya Sabha.

Religion 
The religious scholar Mirwaiz Ghulam Rasool Shah Sahib served the people of Kashmir, upholding Islamic teachings and the religious enlightenment. Mufti Ghulam Nabi Shah Sahib was a religious scholar born in Doru, known for his skill at fiqa Arabic and Persian grammar, along with having partnership in 'Quran' and 'Hadith'.

Shrines 

The Khankah Faiz Panah shrine was constructed by Mir Mohammad Hamadani, the son of Ameer-i-Kabeer Mir Syed Ali Hamadani. The other important shrines of the town include Ziyarat Shah Mohammad Azam Sahib, Syed Jaffer Madani, and Shah Asraar. Hindu tirths such as Luk Bawan (Lokapunya), Vitasta, and Goswanigund are located in Doru.

Settlements 

The older muhallas (settlements) of the town are: Mohalla Shah Sahib, Mirmaidan (birthplace of Rasool Mir), Arabal, Sehpora, Mirgund, Bragam, Khudhamam, Nadoora, and Arampora (birthplace of Syed Mir Qasim).

New colonies like College Road and Iqbal Colony have developed more recently. The well-known spring and Mughal garden Verinag is located 4 kilometres from Doru Shahabad. The two other springs in the area, Shehilnag and Sumnag, are known as "siblings" of Verinag.

References

External links
 Dooru tehsil, OpenStreetMap, retrieved 4 May 2022.
Senior Hurriyat Leader and Acting Chairman Jammu Kashmir Peoples League, Mukhtar Ahmad Waza today visited Dooru Shahabad, Kashmir Watch
Kashmiri Song (Brem Dith Wajnas Naway), YouTube video of song from Doru Shahabad

 

Villages in Anantnag district